The 2019 Grand Prix Cycliste de Montréal was a road cycling one-day race that took place on 15 September 2019 in Canada. It was the 10th edition of Grand Prix Cycliste de Montréal and the 36th event of the 2019 UCI World Tour. 2016 winner Greg van Avermaet won the race for the second time in a reduced bunch sprint.

Teams
Twenty-one teams, which consisted of all eighteen UCI WorldTour teams, two UCI Professional Continental teams, and one national team, participated in the race. Of these riders, only 97 finished.

UCI WorldTeams

 
 
 
 
 
 
 
 
 
 
 
 
 
 
 
 
 
 

UCI Professional Continental teams

 
 

National teams

 Canada

Results

References

Grand Prix Cycliste de Montréal
Grand Prix Cycliste de Montréal
Grand Prix Cycliste de Montréal
Grand Prix Cycliste de Montréal